Sheer Greed were a short-lived British hard rock band formed in 1992 by former Girl members Gerry Laffy, Simon Laffy and Pete Barnacle, and by guitarist Neil Gabbitas. The band was apparently named after the Girl album Sheer Greed.

Gerry Laffy sang lead vocals in Sheer Greed, as well as playing guitar.

The band released one studio album titled Sublime to the Ridiculous, produced by Def Leppard guitarist and fellow former Girl member Phil Collen. In addition, former Girl singer Phil Lewis guested on the album for the song "Everybody Wants," resulting in an unofficial reunion of the Girl lineup, circa 1981–82.

Discography
Sublime to the Ridiculous
Live in London

References

English rock music groups
Musical groups established in 1992
Musical quartets